Leeman M. Brundage (1866 in New York – 1910 in South Norwalk, Connecticut) was a Democratic mayor of South Norwalk, Connecticut from 1909 to 1910. He died of typhoid fever while in office.

He was the manager and treasurer of the Mutual Straw Hat Company.

Associations 
Member, Long Island Lodge of Masons

References 

1866 births
1910 deaths
Connecticut Democrats
Mayors of Norwalk, Connecticut
Deaths from typhoid fever
19th-century American politicians